Fereydunkenar County is in Mazandaran province, Iran. The capital of the county is the city of Fereydunkenar. At the 2006 census, the region's population (as Fereydunkenar District of Babolsar County) was 56,055 in 15,049 households. The following census in 2011 counted 57,980 people in the newly formed Fereydunkenar County, in 17,574 households. At the 2016 census, the county's population was 60,031 in 20,066 households.

Administrative divisions

The population history and structural changes of Fereydunkenar County's administrative divisions over three consecutive censuses are shown in the following table. The latest census shows two districts, four rural districts, and one city.

References

 

Counties of Mazandaran Province